Punjab (alternative names Punjāb, Panjāb, meaning 'five rivers') is the capital of Panjab District, a mountainous district in the southwestern part of the Bamyan Province, Afghanistan. The town is situated at 34°23'N 67°1'E and has an altitude of 2,758 m altitude, the population was 9,900 in the year 2004. There is an airport with gravel surface.

Climate
Owing to its high altitude, Punjab features a humid continental climate (Dsb) under the Köppen climate classification. It has warm, dry summers and cold, snowy winters. The annual precipitation averages .

See also
Bamyan Province

References

External links 
District profile at Bamyan.info 
AIMS District Map 
Punjab Portal
 Statoids Punjab - (Punjab: Panjab (German); Pendjab, Penjab (French).)

Panjab District
Populated places in Bamyan Province